In organic chemistry, the Wurtz reaction, named after Charles Adolphe Wurtz, is a coupling reaction whereby two alkyl halides are treated with sodium metal  to form a higher alkane. 
 2 R−X + 2 Na → R−R + 2 NaX
The reaction is of little value except for intramolecular versions. A related reaction, which combines alkyl halides with aryl halides is called the Wurtz–Fittig reaction.

Mechanism 
The reaction proceeds by an initial metal–halogen exchange, which is described with the following idealized stoichiometry:
 R−X + 2 M → RM + MX
This step may involve the intermediacy of radical species R·.  The conversion resembles the formation of a Grignard reagent. The RM intermediates have been isolated in several cases.  The radical is susceptible to diverse reactions.

The organometallic intermediate (RM) next reacts with the alkyl halide (RX) forming a new carbon–carbon covalent bond.  
 RM  + RX → R−R + MX
The process resembles an SN2 reaction, but the mechanism is probably complex.

Examples and reaction conditions
The reaction is intolerant of a range of functional groups which would be attacked by sodium.  For similar reasons, the reaction is conducted in unreactive solvents such as ethers. In efforts to improve the reaction yields, other metals have also been tested to effect the Wurtz-like couplings: silver, zinc, iron, activated copper, indium, as well as mixture of manganese and copper chloride.

Wurtz coupling is useful in closing small, especially three-membered, rings. In the cases of 1,3-, 1,4-, 1,5-, and 1,6- dihalides, Wurtz-reaction conditions lead to formation of cyclic products, although yields are variable. Under Wurtz conditions, vicinal dihalides yield alkenes, whereas geminal dihalides convert to alkynes. Bicyclobutane was prepared this way from 1-bromo-3-chlorocyclobutane in 95% yield. The reaction is conducted in refluxing dioxane, at which temperature, the sodium is liquid.

Extensions to main group compounds
Although the Wurtz reaction is only of limited value in organic synthesis, analogous couplings are useful for coupling main group halides.  Hexamethyldisilane arises efficiently by treatment of trimethylsilyl chloride with sodium:

Tetraphenyldiphosphine is prepared analogously:

Similar couplings have been applied to many main group halides. When applied to main group dihalides, rings and polymers result.  Polysilanes and polystananes are produced in this way

See also 
 Wurtz–Fittig reaction
 Ullmann reaction

Further reading

Organic-chemistry.org
Organic Chemistry, by Morrison and Boyd
Organic Chemistry, by Graham Solomons and Craig Fryhle, Wiley Publications

References 

Condensation reactions
Carbon-carbon bond forming reactions
Name reactions